Light of the World is overall second studio album by American jazz saxophonist Kamasi Washington, credited on the cover as dedicated to Roland Edwards Jr and generally concerning spiritual and Christianity-related subjects. It was released independently in 2008. It became his last underground album before The Epic which came out in 2015.

Track listing
Based on Rate Your Music.
 Going Up Yonder – 12:58
 The Way, the Truth, and the Light – 3:48
 Give Thanks – 13:29
 The Lord's Prayer – 4:27
 Amazing Grace – 9:04
 Listen Closely – 13:51
 When I Think About Jesus – 7:45

Personnel
Based on:
Tenor saxophone – Kamasi Washington
Bass – Jae Deal
Drums – Robert Miller
Rhodes – Brandon Coleman
Trombone – Ryan Porter (track 4)
Vocals – Manhi-Xan (track 4)

References

External links
 

2008 albums
Kamasi Washington albums